Justice Webb may refer to:

Henry Y. Webb (1784–1823), associate justice of the Alabama Supreme Court
John Webb (judge) (1926–2008), associate justice of the North Carolina Supreme Court
William Webb (judge) (1887–1972), associate justice and chief justice of the Supreme Court of Queensland and the High Court of Australia

See also
Judge Webb (disambiguation)